The Abbot of Kinloss (later Commendator of Kinloss) was the head of the property and Cistercian monastic community of Kinloss Abbey, Moray, founded by King David I of Scotland around 1151 by monks from Melrose Abbey. The abbey was transformed into a temporal lordship for Edward Bruce, the last commendator, who became Lord Kinloss. The following is a list of abbots and commendators:

List of abbots
 Ascelin, 1150-1174
 Reiner, 1174-1189
 Radulf, 1189-1194
 Radulf, 1202x1207-1220
 Robert, 1220
 Herbert, 1226-1251
 Richard, 1251-1274
 Andrew, 1275-1286
 Gilbert, 1296
 Henry, x1316
 Thomas Dere, 1316-1338 x 1344
 Simon, 1346
 Richard, 1362-1371
 Adam de Tarras, 1389-1414
 William de Blare, 1414-1429
 John Floter, 1431-1444 
 Henry Butre/Butoe, 1439-1444
 John de Ellem,   1443-1467
 James Guthrie, 1467-1481
 John Pittendreich, 1478
 William Galbraith, 1481-1490
 Hugh Martini, 1490-1491
 William Culross, 1491-1500
 Andrew Forman, 1492
 Thomas Crystall (Christopheri/Wawain), 1500-1528
 Robert Reid, 1528-1553
 Walter Reid, 1553-1587

List of commendators
 Edward Bruce, 1587-1601

Notes

Bibliography
 Cowan, Ian B. & Easson, David E., Medieval Religious Houses: Scotland With an Appendix on the Houses in the Isle of Man, Second Edition, (London, 1976), p. 76
 Watt, D.E.R. & Shead, N.F. (eds.), The Heads of Religious Houses in Scotland from the 12th to the 16th Centuries, The Scottish Records Society, New Series, Volume 24, (Edinburgh, 2001), pp. 131–34

See also
 Kinloss Abbey

Cistercian abbots by monastery
Scottish abbots
Lists of abbots